The League of Anti-Corruption Governors (LIGA) is a Colombian political movement, created in October 2019 by the former mayor of Bucaramanga, Rodolfo Hernández Suárez, and by the candidates for the 2020–2023 municipal council. It was conceived as an independent civic alternative to traditional political parties and ideologies, with the purpose of reaching the presidency of the republic in the 2022 election. Earlier, in the 2015 local elections, Rodolfo Hernández managed to reach the Mayor's Office of Bucaramanga through an independent candidacy via the "Movimiento Cívico Lógica Etica y Estética", previously founded by Hernández to support his political campaign. In May 2022, Hernández finished in second place in the first round of the presidential elections, proceeding to the second round against Gustavo Petro. He finished in second place in the second round as well.

The leader of the polítical movement, Rodolfo Hernández, declares that he is in favor of same-sex marriage, adoption of children by same-sex couples, legalization of medical and recreational marijuana, euthanasia and assisted suicide. Regarding abortion, he assures that in an eventual government of his this right will be respected and affirms that “it is the woman's decision whether to have an abortion or not”. 

Hernández placed second in the first round and advanced to the runoff but was defeated by Historic Pact for Colombia nominee Gustavo Petro.

Party status 

Hernández submitted an application with the National Electoral Council (CNE) on 19 July 2022 for LIGA to be granted legal status as a political party. In the submission, Hernández emphasised his presidential ticket's second place in the presidential election and how he and Castillo had taken their respective seats in the senate and chamber of representatives reserved for the second place presidential and vice presidential candidates. He also mentioned LIGA's convention, which declared its opposition to the government of Gustavo Petro. The CNE granted legal party status to LIGA on 4 August, and Hernández became the party's president. He appointed his wife, Socorro Oliveros as national director.

Electoral history

Presidential elections

References 

Political parties established in 2019
Political parties in Colombia
2019 establishments in Colombia